was a village located in Onyū District, Fukui Prefecture, Japan.

As of 2003, the village had an estimated population of 2,818 and a density of 19.59 persons per km2. The total area was 143.83 km2.

On March 3, 2006, Natashō was merged into the expanded town of Ōi (in Ōi District).

External links
Official website in Japanese

Dissolved municipalities of Fukui Prefecture
Ōi, Fukui